Ulysses Stanley Wagner (March 2, 1908 – October 11, 2002) was an American-born Canadian ice hockey player who competed in the 1932 Winter Olympics.

Early life and education 
The son of Canadian parents, Wagner was born in Pueblo, Colorado, in 1908. His parents had briefly moved to Colorado with the hope that the climate would cure his father’s tuberculosis. After his birth, Wagner's parents returned to Plum Coulee in Manitoba, and his father died of consumption when he was eight months old. Wagner played hockey as a child and studied accounting at the University of Manitoba for one year.

Career 
In 1932, he was a member of the Winnipeg Hockey Club, the Canadian team which won the gold medal at the 1932 Winter Olympics in Lake Placid, New York. He played one match as goaltender. Wagner became a pilot in 1934. During his career, he flew for Canadian Airways and Northern Air.

External links
Stanley Wagner's profile at Sports Reference.com

References 

1908 births
2002 deaths
Canadian ice hockey goaltenders
Ice hockey players at the 1932 Winter Olympics
Medalists at the 1932 Winter Olympics
Olympic gold medalists for Canada
Olympic ice hockey players of Canada
Olympic medalists in ice hockey
Winnipeg Hockey Club players

Canadian aviators